Serine protease 57 is a protein that in humans is encoded by the PRSS57 gene.

Function

This gene encodes an arginine-specific serine protease and member of the peptidase S1 family of proteins. The encoded protein may undergo proteolytic activation before storage in azurophil granules, in neutrophil cells of the immune system. Following neutrophil activation, the protease is released into the pericellular environment, where it may play a role in defense against microbial pathogens. [provided by RefSeq, Jul 2016].

References

Further reading